Karschia is a genus of fungi in the class Dothideomycetes. The relationship of this taxon to other taxa within the class is unknown (incertae sedis).

The genus name of Karschia is in honour of Anton Ferdinand Franz Karsch (1822-1892), who was a German doctor and botanist. He was in 1852, Professor of Medicine in Münster.

The genus was circumscribed by Gustav Wilhelm Körber in Parerga Lichenol. on page 459 in 1865.

Species

Karschia adnata
Karschia agapanthi
Karschia alpicolae
Karschia artemisiae
Karschia atherospermae
Karschia brachyspora
Karschia crassa
Karschia crassaria
Karschia elaeospora
Karschia elasticae
Karschia epimyces
Karschia fuegiana
Karschia globuligera
Karschia juniperi
Karschia laeta
Karschia latypizae
Karschia linitaria
Karschia microspora
Karschia minuta
Karschia pertusariae
Karschia ricasoliae
Karschia santessonii
Karschia tjibodensis

See also
List of Dothideomycetes genera incertae sedis

References

Dothideomycetes enigmatic taxa
Dothideomycetes genera
Taxa named by Gustav Wilhelm Körber